Kent Wildlife Trust (KWT) is a conservation charity in the United Kingdom that was founded in 1958, previously known as the Kent Trust for Nature Conservation. It aims to "work with people to restore, save and improve our natural spaces" and to "ensure that 30% of Kent and Medway – land and sea – is managed to create a healthy place for wildlife to flourish".  In 2016 it had thirty-one thousand members and an annual income of £4 million. KWT manages over sixty-five nature reserves, of which twenty-four are Sites of Special Scientific Interest, two are national nature reserves, nine are Nature Conservation Review sites, seven are Special Areas of Conservation, three are Special Protection Areas, seven are local nature reserves, one is a Geological Conservation Review site, thirteen are in Areas of Outstanding Natural Beauty and one is a scheduled monument.

Kent is a county in the southeastern corner of England. It is bounded to the north by Greater London and the Thames Estuary, to the west by Sussex and Surrey, and to the south and east by the English channel and the North Sea. The county town is Maidstone. It is governed by Kent County Council, with twelve district councils: Ashford, Canterbury, Dartford, Dover, Folkestone and Hythe, Gravesham, Maidstone, Thanet, Tonbridge and Malling and Tunbridge Wells. Medway is geographically part of Kent but is a separate unitary authority. The chalk hills of the North Downs run from east to west through the county, with the wooded Weald to the south. The coastline is alternately flat and cliff-lined.

Nature reserves

Key

Public access
 FP   = Access to footpaths only
 NO   = No public access to the site
 YES   = Free public access to all or most of the site
 PP   = Public access to part of the site

Classifications
AONB = Area of Outstanding Natural Beauty
GCR = Geological Conservation Review site
LNR = Local nature reserve
NCR = Nature Conservation Review site
NNR = National nature reserve
Ramsar = Ramsar site, an internationally important wetland site
SAC = Special Area of Conservation
SM = Scheduled monument
SPA = Special Protection Area
SSSI = Site of Special Scientific Interest

Sites

Wildlife
The Wilder Blean project, headed up by the Wildwood Trust and Kent Wildlife Trust, is introducing European bison to a 2,500-acre conservation area in Blean, near Canterbury. The reintroduction to the UK in 2022, the first time in 6000 years, will consist of a herd of 3 females and 1 male.

See also
List of Sites of Special Scientific Interest in Kent
List of Local Nature Reserves in Kent

Notes

References

Citations

Sources

External links
Kent Wildlife Trust website

 
Organisations based in Kent
Wildlife Trusts of England
1958 establishments in England